Mead High School is  a public secondary school in Spokane, Washington

Mead High School may also refer to:
Mead High School (Longmont, Colorado), a school in the St. Vrain Valley School District in Longmont, Colorado
Mead High School, a high school in Nebraska

See also
M.E.A.D. Alternative High School or Mead Education Alternative Department Alternative High School, a learning community of non-traditional students and instructors in north Spokane, Washington
Meade County High School, a school in Brandenburg, Kentucky
Meade Senior High School, a school at Fort Meade, Maryland